Teuvo Haverinen is a Finnish professional darts player who competes in Professional Darts Corporation events.

References

External links

Living people
Finnish darts players
Professional Darts Corporation associate players
People from Kuhmo
Year of birth missing (living people)
Sportspeople from Kainuu